Michael Farber (born September 1951) is an American author and sports journalist, and was a writer with Sports Illustrated from 1994 to 2014. He covered mostly ice hockey and olympic sports. Before 1994, Farber spent 15 years as a sports columnist for the Montreal Gazette, and previously wrote for the Bergen Record, and the Sun Bulletin. Farber is a commentator for CJAD 800 AM in Montreal, and on The Sports Network's The Reporters.

Farber grew up in Bayonne, New Jersey. He graduated from Rutgers University in 1973, and is a Phi Beta Kappa Society member. He relocated to Montreal in 1979. He won the Elmer Ferguson Memorial Award in 2003, and is a member of the Hockey Hall of Fame selection committee.

References

1951 births
Living people
American male journalists
American sports journalists
Canadian male journalists
Canadian sports journalists
Elmer Ferguson Award winners
Journalists from New Jersey
Montreal Gazette people
Rutgers University alumni
Sports Illustrated
Writers from Bayonne, New Jersey
Writers from Montreal